Unsought Goods are goods that the consumer does not know about or does not normally think of buying, and the purchase of which arises due to danger or the fear of danger and lack of desire.

The classic examples of known but unsought goods are funeral services, encyclopedias, fire extinguishers and reference books. In some cases even an airplane/helicopters can be cited as examples of unsought goods. The purchase of these goods may not be immediate and can be deferred. Hence, unsought goods require advertising and personal-selling support.

Marketers have classified products on the basis of durability, tangibility and use (consumer or industrial). Based on the consumer products classification arise Unsought Goods.

Converting Unsought Goods to Sought Goods

New products such as frozen food items were unsought till they are advertised using media vehicles or by word of mouth marketing. Once the consumer is well educated about the product, the good goes on to become a sought good. For example: A new smartphone with exclusive features is an unsought good until the consumer hears about it. Once the smartphone is widely known among customers, it becomes a sought good. A classic example here is the Apple iPhone. Consumers are unaware that they want it unless told about it.

Another example to note would be life insurance. Even though it is a classic example of an unsought good; it is fast growing into a sought good. With the conversion of life insurance from just insurance to an investment idea for your future, this good has shifted paradigms.

References 

Consumer goods